The 1999–2000 English football season was Derby County F.C.'s fourth consecutive season in the FA Premier League (known as the FA Carling Premiership for sponsorship reasons).

Season summary
After two successive top 10 finishes which gave promise a possible bid for a UEFA Cup place, Derby County endured their most difficult season in recent year as they finished 16th with a mere 38 points, just two places and five points clear of relegation.

Final league table

Results summary

Results by round

Results
Derby County's score comes first

Legend

FA Premier League

FA Cup

League Cup

Players

First-team squad
Squad at end of season

Left club during season

Reserve squad

Transfers

In

Out

Transfers in:  £12,460,000
Transfers out:  £4,900,000
Total spending:  £7,560,000

Statistics

Starting 11
Considering starts in all competitions
Considering a 3–5–2 formation
 GK: #21,  Mart Poom, 29
 CB: #16,  Jacob Laursen, 38
 CB: #2,  Horacio Carbonari, 31 (#17,  Spencer Prior, has 18 starts as a central defender)
 CB: #5,  Tony Dorigo, 24 (#19,  Steve Elliott, has 22 starts as a central and left defender)
 RM: #10,  Rory Delap, 37
 CM: #4,  Darryl Powell, 33
 CM: #7,  Seth Johnson, 37
 CM: #29,  Stefano Eranio, 18 (#33,  Craig Burley, has 19 starts as a right and central midfielder)
 LM: #3,  Stefan Schnoor, 22
 CF: #8,  Dean Sturridge, 16  
 CF: #9,  Deon Burton, 15

Notes

References

Derby County F.C. seasons
Derby County